Alex Laird (born 21 April 1999) is an English footballer who plays for Silsden, as a central defender.

Career
Laird signed a one-year professional contract with Bradford City in April 2017, and made his senior debut on 24 October 2017, in a Football League Trophy game.

He was released by Bradford City at the end of the 2017–18 season.

After playing with Albion Sports, he signed for Bradford (Park Avenue) in June 2019.

He joined Silsden from Eccleshill United in July 2022.

Career statistics

References

1999 births
Living people
English footballers
Bradford City A.F.C. players
Albion Sports A.F.C. players
Bradford (Park Avenue) A.F.C. players
Association football central defenders
Eccleshill United F.C. players
Silsden A.F.C. players